The 1998 World's Strongest Man was the 21st edition of World's Strongest Man and was won by Magnus Samuelsson from Sweden. It was his first title after finishing third the previous year. 1997 champion Jouko Ahola from Finland finished second, and Wout Zijlstra from the Netherlands finished third. This year had 10 qualifying heats with the winner of each heat going onto the finals. Half the field got injured during the finals of the contest, as well as several heat winners prior to the finals such as Flemming Rasmussen and Gerrit Badenhorst. The contest was held in Tangier/Tétouan, Morocco.

Heats

Group 1

Group 2

Group 3

Group 4

Group 5

Group 6

Group 7

Group 8

Group 9

Group 10

Final results

References

External links
 Official site
 1998 results at Bill Henderson's Strongest Man site

World's Strongest Man
Worlds Strongest Man, 1998